Charlton, Somerset may refer to a number of villages in Somerset, England:

 Charlton, Kilmersdon, Mendip district
Charlton, Shepton Mallet, Mendip district
Charlton, Taunton Deane
Charlton Adam
Charlton Horethorne
Charlton Mackrell
Charlton Musgrove
Queen Charlton, known simply as Charlton until the 16th century